Zenon Adam Różycki (December 18, 1913 – March 31, 1992) was a Polish basketball player who competed in the 1936 Summer Olympics.

He was born in Poznań.

Różycki was part of the Polish basketball team, which finished fourth in the 1936 Olympic tournament. He played all six matches.

References

External links
profile 

1913 births
1992 deaths
Polish men's basketball players
Olympic basketball players of Poland
Basketball players at the 1936 Summer Olympics
Sportspeople from Poznań